Albert Thomas Conn (1879-1944) was a former Major League Baseball pitcher/second baseman. He was born on September 22, 1879, in Philadelphia, Pennsylvania. Bert played three seasons in MLB. In 1898 and 1900, he was a pitcher with the Philadelphia Phillies, and in 1901 he was a second baseman with the Phillies. Conn had an 0–3 career record with 17.3 innings, and had 8 career hits in 30 at bats for a .267 average. He died on November 2, 1944, in Philadelphia.

External links
Baseball Reference

1879 births
1944 deaths
Major League Baseball second basemen
Baseball players from Pennsylvania
Philadelphia Phillies players
Major League Baseball pitchers
19th-century baseball players
Minor league baseball managers
Philadelphia Athletics (minor league) players
Pottsville Greys players
Bloomsburg Blue Jays players
Rochester Bronchos players
Harrisburg Ponies players
Providence Clamdiggers (baseball) players
Providence Grays (minor league) players
York Penn Parks players
Johnstown Johnnies players
York White Rozes players
Reading Pretzels players
Baltimore Orioles (IL) players
Williamsport Millionaires players
Chester Johnnies players
Trenton Tigers players